Etkind is a surname. Notable people with the surname include:

 Alexander Etkind (born 1955), historian and cultural scientist
 Efim Etkind (1918–1999), Soviet philologist and translation theorist